Topology is an album by multi-instrumentalist and composer Joe McPhee, recorded in 1981 and first released on the Swiss HatHut label, it was rereleased on CD in 1990.

Reception

AllMusic awarded the album 3 stars.

Track listing 
All compositions by Joe McPhee
 "Age" – 10:47
 "Blues for Chicago" – 5:34
 "Pithecanthropus Erectus" (Charles Mingus) – 10:33
 "Violets for Pia" – 7:43
 "Topology I & II" (André Jaume, Joe McPhee) – 28:40

Personnel 
Joe McPhee – tenor saxophone, pocket trumpet
André Jaune – alto saxophone, bass clarinet (tracks 1 & 3–5)
Irène Schweizer – piano 
Raymond Boni – guitar (tracks 1–3 & 5)
François Mechali – bass
Radu Malfatti – percussion, trombone, electronics (tracks 1, 3 & 5)
Pierre Favre – percussion (track 5) 
Michael Overhage – cello (tracks 1, 2 & 5)
Tamia  – vocals (track 5)

References 

Joe McPhee albums
1981 albums
Hathut Records albums